Charles-François Painchaud (September 8, 1815 – August 8, 1891) was a physician and political figure in Canada East. He represented Verchères in the Legislative Assembly of the Province of Canada in 1863.

Biography
He was born François-Xavier Painchaud in Île aux Grues, Lower Canada, the son of Jérôme-David Painchaud and Julie Langlois. Painchaud was educated at the Collège de Sainte-Anne-de-la-Pocatière which had been founded by his uncle who was also named Charles-François Painchaud. He practised medicine in Varennes and served on the village council. In 1845, he married Françoise Duchesnois. He was defeated by Alexandre-Édouard Kierzkowski when he ran for a seat in the assembly in 1861 but was declared elected in 1863 after that election was declared invalid; he did not run for reelection later that same year.

He died in Varennes at the age of 75.

References 

Members of the Legislative Assembly of the Province of Canada from Canada East
1815 births
1891 deaths